Heze East railway station is a railway station located in Heze, Shandong, China. It will have 11 platforms and be an interchange between the Beijing–Shangqiu high-speed railway and the Rizhao–Lankao high-speed railway. It opened on 26 December 2021.

See also
Heze railway station

References 

Railway stations in Shandong
Railway stations in China opened in 2021